Vexiguraleus clifdenensis is an extinct species of sea snail, a marine gastropod mollusk in the family Mangeliidae.

Distribution
This extinct marine species can be found in Cenozoic strata in New Zealand

References

 Powell, Arthur William Baden. "The New Zealand recent and fossil Mollusca of the family Turridae with general notes on Turrid nomenclature and systematics." (1942).
 Maxwell, P.A. (2009). Cenozoic Mollusca. pp. 232–254 in Gordon, D.P. (ed.) New Zealand inventory of biodiversity. Volume one. Kingdom Animalia: Radiata, Lophotrochozoa, Deuterostomia. Canterbury University Press, Christchurch

External links
 Worldwide Mollusc Species Data Base: Vexiguraleus clifdenensis

clifdenensis
Gastropods described in 1942